"Living in Sin" is a power ballad by American rock band Bon Jovi. It was written by lead singer Jon Bon Jovi, and was released on October 7, 1989, as the fifth single from their fourth album New Jersey. It also was the fifth single from New Jersey to chart in the Top 10, allowing Bon Jovi to hold the record for the most songs from a glam metal album to reach the Top 10 of the Billboard Hot 100 and  the Cash Box Top 100, peaking at #9 on both charts. It also reached  #37 on the Mainstream rock charts.

Song structure
The song features a slow beat, driven by a strong rhythm by then-bass guitarist Alec John Such. "Living In Sin" bears a delivery of emotional lyrics, driving guitars, and interspersed keyboards. The themes discussed are cohabitation and that true love is stronger than anything, despite what other people may say ('I call it love, they call it living in sin').

When performed live, the band often play a short cover of "Chapel of Love" during the outro of the song.

Music video
The music video for the song was filmed in all black and white, just like "Born to Be My Baby". While the video does feature some shots of the band performing, primarily of Jon Bon Jovi and Richie Sambora, most of the video focuses on a fictional young couple and their struggle to sustain a relationship despite the disapproval of the girl's strict Catholic parents. The promo is noted for several of its steamy romance/sex scenes, including on a beach, in a car, and in a hotel room. The final scene of the video shows the girl running away from home to meet up with her boyfriend, and then the girl's parents walking in on them sleeping together in a hotel room. They take her home, and the video ends when the boyfriend driving in his car to the girl's home, where she snap-decides to run away with him.

Charts

References

1988 songs
1989 singles
Bon Jovi songs
Music videos directed by Wayne Isham
Song recordings produced by Bruce Fairbairn
Songs written by Jon Bon Jovi
Mercury Records singles
Glam metal ballads